The women's 100 metre butterfly competition at the 2002 Pan Pacific Swimming Championships took place on August 24–25 at the Yokohama International Swimming Pool.  The last champion was Jenny Thompson of US.

This race consisted of two lengths of the pool, all in butterfly.

Records
Prior to this competition, the existing world and Pan Pacific records were as follows:

Results
All times are in minutes and seconds.

Heats
The first round was held on August 24.

Semifinals
The semifinals were held on August 24.

Final 
The final was held on August 25.

References

2002 Pan Pacific Swimming Championships
2002 in women's swimming